L39 or L-39 may refer to:
 60S ribosomal protein L39
 Aero L-39 Albatros, a Czechoslovakian jet trainer
 Bell L-39, an American experimental aircraft
 , a destroyer of the Royal Navy
 , a sloop of the Royal Navy
 Lahti L-39, an anti-tank rifle
 Mitochondrial ribosomal protein L39
 Ramona Airport, in San Diego County, California